Quercus ilicifolia, commonly known as bear oak or scrub oak, is a small shrubby oak native to the eastern United States and southeastern Canada. Its range extends in the United States from Maine to North Carolina, with reports of a few populations north of the international frontier in Ontario. The name ilicifolia means "holly-leaved."

Description 
Quercus ilicifolia is a deciduous tree or shrub growing occasionally reaching a height of 6 meters (20 feet) but usually much smaller. It is "gangly" and can form a dense thicket. The plant grows from a large taproot which can be up to 20 centimeters (8 inches) thick. The taproot lives a long time, producing several generations of above-ground parts. The alternately arranged leaves are each up to 15 cm (6 in) long by 10 cm (4 in) wide. The species is monoecious, with plants bearing both male catkins and solitary or clustered female flowers. The plant reproduces sexually by seed and also vegetatively by sprouting new stems.

Distribution and habitat 
Quercus ilicifolia is a dominant plant species in a number of regions and habitat types. In Maine it can be found in deciduous forests alongside red maple (Acer rubrum), gray birch (Betula populifolia), and quaking aspen (Populus tremuloides). In Massachusetts it codominates with black huckleberry (Gaylussacia baccata) on the shrublands of Nantucket and Martha's Vineyard. On Cape Cod it occurs with pitch pine (Pinus rigida) and broom crowberry (Corema conradii). It can be found on the Pine Barrens of New Jersey and pine barrens habitat on Long Island. It also occurs in fire barrens on granite and gneiss further north in Canada. This oak is adapted to disturbance in the habitat, such as wildfire and browsing. Hence, it does not tolerate shade and it requires disturbance to remove other plant species so it can receive sunlight. It sprouts prolifically after fire burns away its above-ground parts.

Quercus ilicifolia is also known to rocky summits in the Piedmont of North Carolina where it is listed as a State Endangered Plant.

Ecology 
Quercus ilicifolia provides food and shelter for many animal species. Bears consume the bitter acorns, especially when preparing for hibernation. White-tailed deer eat the acorns and the stems and foliage. Many types of squirrels cache the acorns. Many birds depend on them; wild turkeys prefer them over other types of food. A large number of insect species live on the oak. This oak species is the main food plant for 29% of the rare or endangered Lepidopterans in southern New England and southeastern New York.

Uses 
Quercus ilicifolia has been used in revegetation projects on the Fresh Kills Landfill on Staten Island.

References

External links
United States department of Agriculture Plants Database: Quercus ilicifolia

ilicifolia
Trees of the Eastern United States
Trees of Eastern Canada
Flora of the Northeastern United States
Flora of the Southeastern United States
Flora of the Appalachian Mountains
Flora of Ontario
Plants described in 1787